The Instituto Politécnico de Bragança (IPB) or in English, the Polytechnic Institute of Bragança, is a Portuguese public higher education institution founded in 1983 whose mission is the creation, transmission, and dissemination of technical-scientific knowledge and knowledge of a professional nature, through the articulation of study, teaching, guided research, and experimental development.

As of 2023, the institute has 8,500 students, with 2,800 being in their first year of higher education, and 30% of the student body is made up of international students, growing 14% overall since 2018. Most courses are taught in Portuguese, however, several bachelor's degrees, and master's degrees are taught in English.

References 

Polytechnics in Portugal
Higher education in Portugal